Battle of Peshawar may refer to:

 Battle of Peshawar (1001), fought between Mahmud of Ghazni and Jayapala
 Capture of Peshawar (1758), fought between the Maratha Empire and Durrani Empire
 Battle of Peshawar (1834), fought between the Sikh Empire and Durrani Empire